The Tevshiin Govi Coal Mine is a coal mine located in the Saintsagaan sum of Dundgovi aimag in southern central Mongolia.

The mine has coal reserves amounting to 923.2 million tonnes of Brown coal. The mine has an annual production capacity of 0.05 million tonnes of coal.

References 

Coal mines in Mongolia